Storhamar Håndball Elite is the women's handball team of the Norwegian multi-sports club Storhamar IL based in Hamar. The team plays in Eliteserien, the top division in the country, since its promotion in 2016.

They are currently competing in the 2022–23 Women's EHF Champions League, for the first time.

Achievements
Eliteserien
Silver: 2018/2019, 2019/2020, 2020/2021, 2021/2022
Bronze: 2007/2008, 2009/2010, 2011/2012, 2017/2018
Norwegian Cup:
Finalist: 2018, 2019
Bronze: 2022/2023

Team

Current squad
Squad for the 2022–23 season.

Goalkeeper
 1  Stine Lidén
 12  Sofie Ege Grønlund
 30  Eli Marie Raasok
Wingers
RW
 9  Selma Brodal
 11  Tina Abdulla
 24  Anna Klausen Jacobsen
LW 
 4  Susanne Amundsen
 5  Marthine Svendsberget
 10  Kristin Venn
Line players
 6  Ane Høgseth 
 18  Olivia Löfqvist
 21  Moa Fredriksson

Back players
LB
 14  Monika Høistad Bruce
 28  Mia Zschocke
 33  Guro Nestaker 
CB
 19  Mathea Enger
 23  Line Ellertsen
 25  Anniken Obaidli
RB
 7  Elinore Johansson
 8  Maja Jakobsen (c) (pregnant)

Transfers
Transfers for the 2023–24 season

 Joining
  Tonje Enkerud (CB) (from  Viborg HK)
  Mathilde Rivas Toft (RB) (from  Viborg HK)
  Olivia Lykke Nygaard (GK) (from  Fana)
  Mia Svele (CB) (from  Nykøbing Falster Håndboldklub)

 Leaving
  Sofie Ege Grønlund (GK) (retires)
  Mia Zschocke (LB) (to  SCM Râmnicu Vâlcea)
  Elinore Johansson (RB) (to  Debreceni VSC)

Technical staff
 Head coach: Kenneth Gabrielsen
 Assistant coach: Axel Stefansson
 Goalkeeping coach:

Notable former National Team players

 Heidi Tjugum
 Anja Hammerseng-Edin
 Heidi Løke
 Chana Masson
 Aleksandra Zimny
 Simona Szarková
 Alma Hasanić Grizović
 Gabriella Juhász
 Betina Riegelhuth
 Emilie Hovden
 Ann Grete Nørgaard

Notable former club players

 Ranveig Haugen
 Marita Brennodden
 Maren Gundersen
 Izabela Duda
 Daria Boltromiuk
 Gina Lorentsen
 Inger Senstad
 Lene Jøranli
 Marthe S. Johansen
 Stine Lidén
 Linn-Marie Birkeland
 Lise Binger
 Lise Løke
 Kamilla Sundmoen
 Anne Kjersti Suvdal
 Malene Aambakk
 Mia Svele
 Elise Skinnehaugen
 Tonje Enkerud
 Tonje Haug Lerstad
 Ellen Marie Folkvord
 Sara Rønningen
 Jeanett Kristiansen
 Cassandra Tollbring

Statistics

Top scorers in the EHF Champions League 
Last updated on 18 March 2023

European record

References 

Norwegian handball clubs
Sport in Hamar
Handball clubs established in 1935
1935 establishments in Norway